Finn Andersen (born 22 February, 1944) is a Danish cultural leader. He is the former Secretary General of the Danish Cultural Institute and leader of the Danish Cultural Institutes of Russia and Great Britain. Andersen is an organizer of intercultural exchange programs between Denmark and countries around the world including the UK, China, Russia, Brazil and India. He is a passionate advocate for Danish music, theatre, literature, dance, art, and education programs and has promoted the arts and the humanities as foundational to society and human understanding.

Family 
Andersen grew up on Mosegaard farm in Vejrum Noerremark, close to the town of Viborg, Denmark. He is the grandson of Anders and Laursine Andersen, and the oldest son of Kristen Dahl Andersen (born1909) and Sofie Andersen. He has a younger brother, Anders Andersen, and two older sisters Jenny (deceased) and Grethe. Andersen attended Viborg Katedralskole, and later attended Aarhus University. 

In 1973, Andersen married British-born Vivien Andersen (née Hahn, born 15 June, 1946), then a British Tourism Officer, and the couple lived in Roende, Denmark. Their two children, Anne-Sofie Hahn Andersen (born 3 November, 1977) and Simon Michael Hahn Andersen (born 3 June, 1980-died July 22, 2014) were born in Grenaa. In 1984, Andersen moved to Edinburgh to run an outpost of the Danish Cultural Institute. Andersen and Vivien ran the Danish Scottish Society in Scotland from the Institute building. Andersen and Vivien divorced in 2001. In 2007, Andersen married Russian-born Elena Z Andersen (born April 6, 1961), then working at the Danish Consulate General in St.Petersburg, Russia. Andersen has a stepson, Pavel Stolypin, and a step-granddaughter Dasha Stolypin.  

Andersen's daughter Anne-Sofie is married to Paul Berger. He has two grandchildren, Ella Elizabeth Andersen Berger (born 8 November, 2009) and Kaja Sylvia Andersen Berger (born 8 June, 2012). 

Andersen lives together with his wife, Elena, north of Copenhagen, Denmark.

Education

Andersen attended Viborg Katedralskole, and later attended Aarhus University.

He earned an M.A. (Aarhus University), M.Sc. (Herriot Watt University), HonDLit (Napier University).

Career
Andersen began his career as an English teacher at Kaloe School of Languages (1968-84). He then became Director of The Danish Cultural Institute for Great Britain, Edinburgh (1985-97). He returned to Denmark as Secretary General of The Danish Cultural Institute, Copenhagen (1997-2013). 

Andersen later moved to Russia to become Director of The Danish Cultural Institute for Russia in St. Petersburg (2014-17); He was Adjunct Professor at Aalborg University (2006 -2011). He helped to form and was later President of EUNIC (EU National Institutes for Culture) (2009-10).

Andersen received the Order of the Knight of Dannebrog.

References

External links
Head Office, Danish Cultural Institute
https://www.bog-ide.dk/produkt/2282378/orla-madsen-vitus-bering-teatret-og-dansk-russiske-kulturforbindelser

1944 births
Living people
21st-century Danish politicians
Recipients of the Order of the Cross of Terra Mariana, 4th Class